Hazlegrove Preparatory School is a non-selective co-educational preparatory school at Sparkford, Somerset in the south west of England. Hazlegrove is part of a foundation which also incorporates King's School, Bruton - a senior school located less than 10 miles away in Bruton.

History

The school's history reaches back in time to 1519 during the reign of Henry VIII and as part of the King's School Bruton Foundation, Hazlegrove is part of an educational lineage which spans nearly five centuries. The school was founded by Richard Fitzjames (Bishop of London) and his nephew John Fitzjames of Redlynch (later to become Chief Justice of the King's Bench) whose family crest incorporated the bearded dolphin which remains part of the school crest today.

The school is part of a foundation created by Richard Fitzjames (Bishop of London) with his nephew John Fitzjames (later to become Chief Justice of the King's Bench) whose family crest incorporated the bearded dolphin which remains part of the school crest today.  After only twenty years of existence, the school was closed with the dissolution of the Monasteries resulting with the surrender of the Abbey including all the endowments of the school to Henry VIII until 1547, and then Edward VI, his son.  For ten years the school ceased to exist until a "humble petition" was presented to Edward VI requesting him to restore the endowments of the school.  This was granted with the school being called the Free Grammar School of King Edward the Sixth.  This Royal Foundation led to a crown being placed above the dolphin on the school crest. The original endowments of the school were re-granted to a Corporation that was to consist of twelve governors.   This may be the first school to have a Governing Body with an unbroken record of the proceedings of the meetings of the Governors dating back to 1553. Hazlegrove Preparatory School was created when the Junior School was moved to Hazlegrove House, after World War II in 1947, to be able to satisfy the increasing demand for places.

A new building for the school costing £1.6 million, designed by the architects Feilden Fowles, was completed recently, the Fitzjames Building, which has become the hub of many activities within the school.

Boarding
Approximately 1/3 of pupils aged 7 to 13 board full-time at the school with the majority staying in at weekends.

Curriculum
All pupils participate in sport, music and drama. Forest School / Outdoor Education, Latin and Mandarin feature alongside traditional academic subjects. Able pupils are stretched to scholarship level and the school has a CReSTeD accredited Learning Support Unit to help pupils with additional needs (e.g. dyslexia).

Notable former pupils
Maddie Hinch, English field hockey player
Tobias Jones, British writer and Journalist
Peter Wilson, English sport shooter, 2012 Olympic Double Trap Gold Medallist

References

External links

The Hazlegrove Association for old Hazlegrovians
Profile on IAPS website
Profile on the ISC website
Profile on the Good Schools Guide
ISI Inspection Reports
Muddy Stillettos Review

Boarding schools in Somerset
Preparatory schools in Somerset